This article is a list of think tanks based in Canada.

This table is partly based on a list of think tanks published by McGill University's Career Planning Service, and on a list by Trent University, 
as well as think tanks with Wikipedia articles listed in related Wikipedia categories.
 Political and economic think tanks (based on inclusion in Wikipedia category)
Think tanks in Canada

Think tanks: political poles
In 2014, Western University's Donald Abelson, an expert on think tanks, classified these major Canadian think tanks on the political spectrum at the request of TVO's "The Agenda". Abelson situated the Fraser Institute, C.D. Howe Institute, the Montreal Economic Institute, the Manning Foundation, the Macdonald-Laurier Institute, the Atlantic Institute for Market Studies on the right; the Institute for Research on Public Policy (IRPP), the Conference Board of Canada, the Caledon Institute, the Centre for International Governance Innovation (CIGI), and the Canadian International Council (formerly the Canadian Institute of International Affairs) in the centre, and the Canadian Centre for Policy Alternatives, the Broadbent Institute, and the Parkland Institute on the left. Clark who wrote the article, noted that the think tanks may not agree with these classifications and that the "left, right and centre paradigms" have become "an increasingly vague and even problematic way to view politics."

Notes

References

 
 
Canada
Canada